Lisa Fain is a food writer and blogger who grew up outside of Houston, Texas, is known as the Homesick Texan and is a writer of two cookbooks. She is the winner of the 2014 James Beard Foundation award for Best Individual Food Blog.

References

Living people
American food writers
American women bloggers
American bloggers
Writers from Houston
Women food writers
Women cookbook writers
James Beard Foundation Award winners
American women non-fiction writers
21st-century American non-fiction writers
Year of birth missing (living people)
21st-century American women writers